Following is a list of colleges affiliated to the Panjab University in Chandigarh. Panjab University is a collegiate public university established  in 1947 and tracing its origins to the University of the Punjab in Lahore, which was founded in 1882. It has 188 affiliated colleges spread over the state of Punjab and the union-territory of Chandigarh.

List
List of colleges affiliated to Panjab University, sorted by district:

Abohar
Bhag Singh Hayer Khalsa College for Women
DAV College
DAV College of Education
Gopichand Arya Mahila College
Guru Nanak Khalsa College
Jyoti B.Ed. College
Kenway College of Education
Maharishi Dayanand College of Education

Barnala
Sanatan Dharam College – S.D. College

Chandigarh
Brahmrishi Yoga Training College
Chandigarh College of Architecture – CCA
Chandigarh College of Engineering and Technology – CCET
DAV College
Dev Samaj College for Women
Dev Samaj College of Education
Goswami Ganesh Dutta Sanatan Dharma College – GGDSD
Government College of Art
Government College of Commerce and Business Administration – GCCBA
Government College of Education
Government College of Yoga Education and Health
Government Home Science College
Government Medical College and Hospital – GMCH
Guru Gobind Singh College for Women
Homoeopathic Medical College and Hospital
Homoeopathic Medical College and Hospital
Mehr Chand Mahajan Dayanand Anglo Vedic College for Women – MCM DAV College
National Institute of Nursing Education – NINE
Post Graduate Government College, Sector 11
Post Graduate Government College, Sector 46
Post Graduate Government College for Girls, Sector 11
Post Graduate Government College for Girls, Sector 42
Regional Institute of English – RIE
Shri Dhanwantry Ayurvedic College and Hospital
Shri Guru Gobind Singh College, Sector 26

Firozpur
Babe Ke College of Education
DAV College for Women
Dev Samaj College for Women
GGS DAV Centenary College
Government College
Guru Ram Dass B.Ed. College
Lala Jagat Narayan Education College
Lala Jagat Naryan Institute of Technology and Management
M.R. Government College
RSD College
Surjeet Memorial College of Education

Mansa
Nehru Memorial Government College

Hoshiarpur
Babbar Akali Memorial Khalsa College – BAM
Dashmesh Girls College
DAV College
DAV College for Girls
DAV College of Education
Giani Kartar Singh Memorial Government College
Goswami Guru Dutt Sanatan Dharam College – GGDSD
Government College – Hoshiarpur
Guru Nanak College of Education
Guru Nanak Khalsa College for Women
Guru Teg Bahadur Khalsa College
Jagdish Chandra DAV College
Khalsa College
Maharaj Brahmanand Bhuriwale Garib Dassi *Rana Gajinder Chand B.Ed. Girls College
Rayat Bahra College of Education
S.D. College
Saini Bar College
Sant Baba Hari Singh Memorial Khalsa College of Education
Sant Majha Singh Karamjot College for Women – SMSKC
SGGS Khalsa College
Siri Guru Har Rai Sahib College for Women
Sri Guru Gobind Singh College of Education
Swami Premanand Mahavidyalaya

Khanna
Anglo Sanskrit College for Women
AS College
AS College for Women
AS College of Education
Gobindgarh Public College

Ludhiana
Arya College
Baba Kundan Rural College of Education
Bahadur Chand Munjal College of Education – BCM
Bhai Nagahia Singh Memorial Girls College
Bhutta College of Education
DD Jain College of Education
Devki Devi Jain Memorial College for Women
Doraha College of Education for Women
GHG Harprakash College for Women
GHG Khalsa College of Education
Gobindgarh College of Education
Government College for Women
GTB National College
Guru Gobind Singh Khalsa College for Women
Guru Gobind Singh Khalsa College of Education for Women
Guru Nanak College of Education
Guru Nanak College of Law
Guru Nanak Girls College
Guru Nanak Khalsa College for Women
G.G.N.KHALSA COLLEGE,CIVIL LINES,LUDHIANA
Guru Nanak National College
Kamla Lohtia Sanatan Dharam College
Khalsa College for Women
Lajpat Rai DAV College
Mai Bhago College for Women
Malwa Central College of Education for Women
Malwa College Bondli Samrala
Mata Ganga Khalsa College for Girls
Mata Gurdev Kaur Memorial Shahi Sports *College of Physical Education
Partap College of Education
Ramgarhia Girls College
Sadbhavna College of Education for Women
Satish Chandra Dhawan Government College
SCD Government College
SDP College for Women
Shree Atam Vallabh Jain College
Shree Atam Vallabh Jain College Institute of Management and Technology Studies
Sri Aurobindo College of Commerce and Management
Swami Ganga Giri Janta Girls College
University Business School – UBS
Malerkotla
Kalgidhar Institute of Higher Education

Moga
Arjan Dass College
Baba Kundan Singh Memorial Law College
Baba Mangal Singh Institute of Education
DM College of Education
Guru Nanak College
Jagat Sewak Khalsa College for Women
Lala Hans Raj Memorial College of Education
Lala Lajpat Rai Memorial College of Education
Moga College of Education for Girls
Sant Baba Bhag Singh Memorial Girls College of Education
Sant Darbara Singh College of Education for Women
Satyam College of Education
Shukdeva Krishna College of Education for Girls
Tagore College of Education

Mohali
Indo Global College of Education
Lord Krishna College of Education for Girl

Muktsar
Bawa Nihal Singh B.Ed. College
Dasmesh Girls College of Education
Guru Gobind Singh College of Education
Guru Nanak College for Girls
JD College of Education
Maharaja Ranjit Singh College
Saint Sahara College of Education

Nawanshahr
BKM College of Education

Patiala
Asian Institution College of Professional Education
Jagdish Chandra DAV College

Ropar
Rayat College of Education
Rayat College of Law
Rayat College of Physical Education
Shivalik Hills College of Education

References

Panjab University